Jason Connoy, better known as MoSS, is a Canadian hiphop record producer from Toronto, Ontario.

Rapper Obie Trice recently released Special Reserve, a collection of previously unreleased and rare tracks produced by MoSS. He is also co-credited on Eternia's 2010 album At Last, an album which was named as a longlisted nominee for the 2011 Polaris Music Prize.

Discography
Marching to the Sound of My Own Drum (2015)

Production credits

1998 

 "My Position" 12" by Eclipse (on Conception Records - CON014)
 "My Position" (from the Conception Records compilation Walkman Rotation)

1999 

 "Well Known Asshole" / "Gimmie My Dat Back" by Obie Trice (on No Air Play Records)

2001 

 "Mr Trice" / "Mr. Trice" / "Dope Jobs Homeliss" by Obie Trice (on Certified Records CERT-012)
 "He's the Man" / "Dangerous" by Ranahersi (on Certified Records CERT-016)
 "Fame City" by Eclipse (on Certified Records) (test press only)

2003 

 "8 Miles" by Obie Trice off Cheers Special Edition (on Shady Records)
 "Looking Down the Barrel" by Black Moon feat Sean Price (on Duck Down Music Inc.)
 "Da Won" / "Bump Da Gunz" by Saj Supreme (on ABB Records)

2004 

 "Come Gurp with Me" / "Free Spirited" / "Lightning in a Bottle" / "Buckle Up" / "Spit" / "Two Bad Ants" / "Knock on Wood" / "No Cure for Sugar" / "Glued" / "God Was Watching" / "Z-Mutiny" / "UFO" / "Biggets and Bitches" / "Sleeping Pills" by Z-Man off Dope or Dog Food? (on Refill Records)
 "No Cure For Sugar" by Z-Man off Various Artists: The Building (on Hieroglyphics Imperium Recordings)

2005 

 "One Two Y'all" by Sean Price off Monkey Barz (on Duck Down Music Inc.)
 "1,2" by Slum Village off Slum Village (on Barak Records)
 "Envious" by AZ feat Bounty Killer off A.W.O.L. (on Quiet Money Recordings / Fast Life Music)
 "Get Back" by Smif-n-Wessun feat Boot Camp Clik off Smif 'n' Wessun: Reloaded (on Duck Down Music Inc.)
 "Reckless" by the Dayton Family feat Cormega off Family Feud (on Fast Life Records)
 "Niggaz Get Knocked" by Consequence off A Tribe Called Quence (on Draft Records)
 "We Gangsta" / "Militant Soldiers" by Big Shug off Who's Hard (on Sure Shot Records)
 "Street Law" by Shaun Pen off Code of the Streets (on Fast Life Music)

2006 

 "Kilo" by Ghostface Killah feat Raekwon off Fishscale (on Def Jam Recordings)
 "Walk Wit Me" by The Game off G.A.M.E. (on Fast Life Music)
 "I'm So Down" by Omillio Sparks off The Payback (on Koch Entertainment)
 "Our Time" by Chino XL feat Proof of D12 off Poison Pen (on Activate Entertainment)
 "Where's Brooklyn At?" by Block McCloud feat Pumpkinhead, War Bixby, Mr. Met off Spitin' Image (on Day by Day Entertainment)

2007 

 "125 pt 1 (The Bio)" by Joell Ortiz off The Brick: Bodega Chronicles (on Koch Entertainment)
 "Oops Upside Your Head" by Sean Price feat Smif-N-Wessun off Jesus Price Supastar (on Duck Down Music Inc.)
 "Ghetto Children" by Red Café & DJ Envy off The Co-Op (on Koch Entertainment)
 "Intro" / "Street Champ" / "Hood With That" / "Warpath" / "Walk Away" / "Leg Breakers" / "Spit It Real" / "Call Me Back" / "Hear Me" / "What You Gonna Do?" / "Interlude" / "Exposed" / "Lost" / "After Me" by Big Shug off Street Champ (on Babygrande Records)
 "Broken Pieces" by La Coka Nostra feat Jeru The Damaja off Black Metal (on Uncle Howie Records)
 "Black Metal" by Ill Bill feat Q-Unique & Sick Jacken off 'Black Metal' (on Uncle Howie Records)
 "Fight Club" by Special Teamz off Stereotypez (on Duck Down Music Inc.)
 "Liquid Wordz" by Canibus feat Killah Priest & Sun off For Whom the Beat Tolls (on Mic Club Music)

2008 

 "Kilo" (remix) by Ghostface Killah feat Raekwon & Malice (of Clipse) off GhostDeini the Great (on Def Jam Recordings)
 "The Life" by Kool G Rap off Half a Klip (on Latchkey Recordings)
 "You Know What We About" by Ransom off Street Cinema (on Babygrande Records)
 "Murdapan" / "123 Bang" / "Bring It Back" / "The Meaning of Hardcore" / "Militant Soldiers II" by Big Shug off Other Side of the Game (on Traffic Entertainment Group)
 "Up" by D-Sisive off The Book (on Urbnet Records)
 "I Shall Remain" by Sav Killz off Success is Inevitable

2009 

 Special Reserve (album) by Obie Trice (on Moss Appeal Music)
 "Have Mercy" by Raekwon feat Beanie Sigel off Only Built 4 Cuban Linx... Pt. II (on Ice H2O Records) (uncredited)
 "Blood on the Wall" by Joe Budden off Padded Room (on Amalgam Digital)
 "Connection" by KRS-One & Buckshot off Survival Skills (on Duck Down Music Inc.)
 "Kilo Rap" by Big Noyd feat Termanology & Ghetto off Queens Chronicles (on Noyd Inc.)

2010 

 "Keep Movin On" by Vinnie Paz feat Shara Worden off Season of the Assassin (on Enemy Soil Records)
 At Last (EP) by Eternia & Moss feat Joell Ortiz, Ras Kass, Rah Digga, Jean Grae, Tye Phoenix, Rage (on Fat Beats)
 At Last (album) by Eternia & Moss (on Fat Beats)
 "Born Survivor" by Inspectah Deck feat Cormega off Manifesto (on Urban Icon Records)

2011 

 "Dear Lord" by Apathy feat Eternia & Diabolic off Honkey Kong (on Dirty Version Records)
 "Blood Brothaz Pt. 2" by St. Da Squad off DJ Deadeye Substance Abuse (on Brick Records)

2013 

 "Inverted Churches" by Gore Elohim off Electric Lucifer (on Supercoven Records)
 "Paul Balof" by Ill Bill off The Grimy Awards (on Uncle Howie Records)
 "Revolution is Here" by Reks off Revolution Cocktail

2015 

 "Unorthodox" by Supastition off Gold Standard (on Reform School Music)
 "Makes Moves, Get Money" by Big Shug off Triple OGzus (on Brick Records)

2016 

 "Septagram" by Ill Bill off Septagram (on Uncle Howie Records)
 "Impression, Sunrise" by Reks off The Greatest X (on Brick Records)

2017 

 Return of the Don (album) by Kool G Rap (on Clockwork Music)
 "Soviet Official" by Apathy and O.C. off Perestroika(on Dirty Version Records)

References

Year of birth missing (living people)
Living people
Place of birth missing (living people)
Canadian hip hop record producers
Musicians from Toronto